Count Tamás Erdődy de Monyorókerék et Monoszló (1558 – 17 January 1624), also anglicised as Thomas Erdődy, was a Hungarian-Croatian nobleman, who served as Ban of Croatia between 1583-1595 and 1608-1615 and a member of the Erdődy magnate family. He scored significant victories in wars against the Ottoman Empire's armies.

Biography
Tamás Erdődy was born in 1558 as the son of former ban Péter Erdődy and Margit Tahy. He had two siblings. He married Maria Ungnad, the daughter of Croatian ban Krsto Ungnad, they had three sons (including ban Zsigmond Erdődy) and four daughters. Through his sons, Tamás Erdődy was also a grandfather of Hungarian nobles György Erdődy and Imre Erdődy.

He succeeded his father-in-law Krsto Ungnad as Ban of Croatia in 1583. His first victory occurred at the battle of Slunj in 1584. In 1591 he freed the Moslavina region. In 1592 he suffered his only great defeat at the battle of Brest. When Ottoman forces tried to retake the area in 1593, the battle of Sisak ensued in which the Holy Roman Empire defeated the Ottoman Empire, severely hampering the Ottoman's ability to expand further into Europe and triggering the Long Turkish War. For this victory Erdődy received congratulations from Pope Clement VIII and was knighted into the Order of Saint Saviour by Philip II of Spain. The phrase "In deo vici" (English: In god I have won) is attributed to him following the victory in Sisak.

He left his role as ban in 1595. He served as master of the stewards between 1598 and 1603 then master of the treasury between 1603 and 1608. He participated in Stephen Bocskay's War of Independence as an ally of the Habsburgs. Meanwhile, he was also perpetual count of Varaždin County since 1607, which position became hereditary since then, given to the Erdődy family.

Erdődy reclaimed the position of ban from 1608 to 27 November 1614 when he renounced his position, but held his rank at the request of the Croatian Parliament until a new Ban, Benedek Thuróczy, was named on 16 February 1615. Following that, Erdődy was made master of the treasury, holding the office until his death on 17 January 1624. During his lifetime he ran for the position of Palatine of Hungary twice (1596, 1611), but the Protestant estates prevented his election referring to his "religious intolerance".

References

Bans of Croatia
Masters of the treasury (Kingdom of Hungary)
Croatian nobility
Military commanders of Croatian kingdoms
Tamas
Counts of Croatia
Hungarian nobility
16th-century Croatian people
16th-century Hungarian people
1558 births
1624 deaths
Masters of the stewards
Burials at Zagreb Cathedral